Verticordia serotina is a flowering plant in the myrtle family, Myrtaceae and is endemic to the north-west of Western Australia. It is a shrub with egg-shaped leaves and bright pink flowers with long, curved styles in spring.

Description

Flowering time is from August to September, sometimes later.

Taxonomy and naming
Verticordia serotina was first formally described by Alex George in 1991 from a specimen he collected near Exmouth and the description was published in Nuytsia. The specific epithet (serotina) is a Latin words meaning "happening late" referring to the later flowering of this species compared to the closely related V. forrestii.

George placed this species in subgenus Eperephes, section Pennuligera along with V. comosa, V. chrysostachys, V. lepidophylla, V. aereiflora, V. dichroma, V. x eurardyensis, V. muelleriana, V. argentea, V. albida, V. fragrans, V. venusta, V. forrestii, V. oculata, V. etheliana and V. grandis.

Distribution and habitat
This verticordia usually grows in deep sand in heath and shrubland. It occurs in the Cape Range National Park and nearby stations in the Carnarvon biogeographic region.

Conservation
Verticordia serotina is classified as "Priority Two" by the Western Australian Government Department of Parks and Wildlife, meaning that it is poorly known and known from only one or a few locations.

Use in horticulture
Verticordia serotina has only been successfully cultivated in Kings Park Botanic Garden. It has been propagated from cuttings and by grafting onto Chamelaucium uncinatum rootstock.

References

serotina
Rosids of Western Australia
Eudicots of Western Australia
Plants described in 1991